Laurel Hell Tour (also called as 2022 Tour) is a concert tour by Japanese-American singer-songwriter Mitski, in support of her sixth studio album Laurel Hell (2022). The tour began on February 17, 2022, in Asheville, North Carolina and concluded on November 18, 2022, in Mexico City.

Background
On October 5, 2021, Mitski announced the tour alongside the release of the single, "Working for the Knife". She then announced that rock band Chai, indie pop group Michelle and indie rock musician Sasami would support the tour as the opening acts during the first leg.

Due to a positive COVID-19 test in a touring party, Mitski postponed the shows in Boston, New York and Philadelphia in March. On April 5, 2022, Mitski announced the replacement dates, festival appearances and additional dates with supporting acts, indie rock musician Indigo De Souza, folk band The Weather Station and Americana project Hurray for the Riff Raff. Alongside headlining tour dates, Mitski would appear as the opening act for Harry Styles' Love On Tour during the United Kingdom stadium shows. Mitski announced the supporting acts for the second European leg, including Irish singer-songwriter Sorcha Richardson, American ambient pop singer Cassandra Jenkins and Australian indie rock musician Stella Donnelly.

Set list
This set list is from the concert on February 17, 2022, in Asheville, North Carolina. It is not intended to represent all tour dates.

"Love Me More"
"Should've Been Me"
"Francis Forever"
"First Love / Late Spring"
"Me and My Husband"
"Stay Soft"
"Townie"
"I Don't Smoke"
"Once More to See You"
"Nobody"
"I Will"
"Drunk Walk Home"
"Happy"
"Your Best American Girl"
"I Bet on Losing Dogs"
"The Only Heartbreaker"
"Geyser"
"Working for the Knife"
"Heat Lightning"
"Goodbye, My Danish Sweetheart"
"Washing Machine Heart"
"A Pearl"

Encore
"Two Slow Dancers"

Tour dates

Notes

References

2022 concert tours